Reed Tablemount (also referred to as Reed Bank, Recto Bank and several other names) is a large tablemount or guyot in the South China Sea north-east of Dangerous Ground and north-east of the Spratly Islands. The submerged but hydrocarbon-rich area includes Nares Bank and Marie Louise Bank.

Although  the Permanent Court of Arbitration ruled in 2016 that the area is within the Philippine Exclusive Economic Zone, economic rights to the area continue to be disputed – mainly by the People's Republic of China – and exploitation of the hydrocarbon reserves by the Philippines were suspended in 2015.

The tablemount is in the northeast quadrant of the Philippine's Kalayaan claimed territory, which also includes most of the north and east portions of the Spratly Islands. The area is located off the northwest coast of Palawan, north of Iroquois reef, Pennsylvania reef and the Southern reefs, and east of the northern part of the Spratly Islands. The nearest occupied parts of the Spratly Islands are Philippine-occupied Flat Island, Nanshan Island and Second Thomas Shoal, and the PRC-occupied Mischief Reef.

History 

Subsequent to the Chinese occupation of Mischief Reef in the mid-1990s, a Philippine World War II-vintage naval landing craft, (LST 57 - Sierra Madre), was deliberately run aground on the Second Thomas Shoal in 1999 to maintain a Philippine naval outpost in the area; more than 15 years later it continues to be manned by about a dozen Philippine Marines.

In June 2019 a Filipino fishing vessel was hit and sunk by a Chinese fishing vessel. The Armed Forces of the Philippines stated that they believed it to be a deliberate attack given the nature of the incident, the wood-hulled Filipino vessel Gimver 1 was sitting at anchor when hit, and the steel-hulled Chinese vessel which hit it failed to stop and offer assistance after the incident. The 22 crew members had to be rescued off of the sinking vessel by a nearby Vietnamese fishing vessel which responded to their distress calls.

Oil, gas and SC72 
Seismic surveys indicate that the Reed Tablemount is rich in oil and gas deposits, but they have only been partly tapped due to disputed claims from various countries, most particularly the PRC.

Exploration in the area began in 1970, and in 1976 gas was discovered in the Sampaguita structure following the drilling of a well. In total, three wells have been drilled to date, all located at the south west end of the Sampaguita structure.
The initial 2-year concession by the Philippines' Government to extract the resources, (SC72, formerly GSEC101,) was awarded to Sterling Energy PLC in June 2002. In April 2005, Forum Energy PLC (FEP) acquired the concession from Sterling and became its operator. Forum Energy PLC (FEP) is a London-based listed oil and gas exploration firm focused on the Philippines; it is 64.45% owned by Philex Petroleum Corporation. In February 2010, the licence was converted to a Service Contract. In February 2011, Forum Energy began a geophysical survey in the SC 72 licence area.  That March, two PRC Navy patrol boats threatened to ram Forum Energy's ships, ordering them out of the area on the basis that the Reed Tablemount was under PRC jurisdiction.  Forum Energy chose to cease on-site operations in the face of the Chinese aggression.
 
In July 2011 the Philippines' Department of Energy (DOE) approved the commencement of a 2-year phase of the project leading to the drilling of 2 wells, and preparations commenced. However, the PRC Government had also granted exploration rights to the area to the PRC State-owned China National Offshore Oil Corporation (CNOOC).  The PRC objected to the Philippine arrangement.  The requisite approvals from the Philippine DOE to commence drilling were not issued, and the project was placed on hold.

In May 2012, the then Philex chairman and CEO, "MVP" (Manuel V. Pangilinan), made an offer to CNOOC, which CNOOC turned down.  There have been further meetings between Philex and CNOOC, but the project remains on hold.

References

External links
 Reed Tablemount, Centre for International Law, National University of Singapore
 Reed Tablemount and Bank, marineregions.org

South China Sea
Banks of the Spratly Islands